Foundation for Freedom, Growth and Development of Iran, backronymed BARAN Foundation (meaning Rain Foundation) is an Iranian not-for-profit non-governmental organization headed by Mohammad Khatami. Almost all members of the foundation are reformists.

See also
 Omid Iranian Foundation

References

External links
Official website 

Reformist political groups in Iran
Think tanks based in Iran
Political and economic think tanks based in Iran
2005 establishments in Iran